Carlo I Cybo-Malaspina (18 November 1581 - 13 February 1662) was an Italian nobleman, who was prince of Massa and marquis of Carrara from 1623 until his death.

Born in Ferrara, he was the son of Alderano Cybo-Malaspina and Marfisa d'Este. He was also Duke of Ferentillo and held other patrician positions in several of the numerous Italian states of the time. In 1605, he married the Genoese noblewoman Brigida Spinola, from whom he had numerous children.

The eldest of them, Alberico, succeeded him after his death in 1662.

1581 births
1662 deaths
Nobility from Ferrara
Cybo-Malaspina